Combat stores ships, or storeships, are ships used to store naval supplies. They are used to deliver supplies such as provisions and fuel to combat ships on extended deployments. They carry the fleets's refrigerated stores, dry provisions, technical spares, general stores, fleet freight, mail and replacement personnel\specialists.Storeships should not be confused with fast combat support ships which are high speed auxiliary ships or tenders which provide maintenance support to flotillas.

Storeship

Both the United States and the United Kingdom used stores ships in the War of 1812. In both the Mexican–American War and in the American Civil War, captured enemy prizes that were not considered "warlike" enough to be sold for prize money often became stores ships for a naval force operating where no friendly ports are nearby.  took part in the Baja California Campaign in the Mexican–American War. In both the Spanish–American War and the Philippine–American War the US Navy acquired the stores ship  and other similar vessels to serve in its Asiatic Squadron.

Combat stores ship

US Navy
Six combat stores ships operated by Military Sealift Command provided supplies, including frozen, chilled and dry provisions, and propulsion and aviation fuel to United States Navy combatant ships at sea for extended periods of time. Combat stores ships did not carry ammunition for resupply.

Combat stores ships provided underway replenishment of all types of supplies, ranging from repair parts to fresh food, clothing and mail via tensioned cargo rigs and CH-46 Sea Knight helicopters or their commercial equivalents. Combat stores ships have been replaced by the more capable s in the US Navy.

Former combat stores ships

San Diego was deactivated on December 10, 1997 and Mars was deactivated on February 12, 1998. Sirius was sold in 2005, Spica was used as a target ship and sunk in 2009 and Saturn was used as a target ship and sunk in 2010.

See also
Replenishment oiler

References 

Ship types